The Moravian-Silesian Christian Social Party in Moravia, was a Czech Christian-social political party in Moravia and Austrian Silesia during times of Austria-Hungary. After its foundation in 1889, party remained in close cooperation with the Catholic National Party in Moravia.

References

Political parties established in 1889
Political parties disestablished in 1919
Catholic political parties
Political parties in Austria-Hungary
Defunct Christian political parties
KDU-ČSL